Juri Poljans (born 24 November 1958) is an Estonian sprint canoer who competed for the Soviet Union. He won a gold medal in the K-4 500 m event at the 1981 ICF Canoe Sprint World Championships in Nottingham. He was named the Estonian male athlete of the year in 1981.

References

Living people
Soviet male canoeists
Russian male canoeists
ICF Canoe Sprint World Championships medalists in kayak
1958 births